Columbia Chorale is an American choir based in Columbia, Missouri. It is a 60 plus men and women's mixed voice classical community choir that performs six or more concerts per season. It is sometimes in partnership and often shares talent with the University of Missouri School of Music.

Concerts
Columbia Chorale partners with  the Columbia Civic Orchestra] the 9th St. Philharmonic Orchestra], and professional guest soloists.  Most concerts are performed at the  Missouri United Methodist church Concert Series but the chorale also performs in Jesse Hall as part of the University of Missouri-Columbia Concert Series and at the Missouri Theater Center for the Arts.

Columbia Chorale has an annual Messiah Sing Along and on several occasions it has performed at the Cathedral of the Immaculate Conception in Kansas City and the Church of St. Mary the Virgin, Aldermanbury in Fulton, Missouri.

History
Columbia Chorale was founded in June 1978 as the Ad Hoc Singers by Christine Leonard Cox. In September 1979, the organization split into two choral groups: the “Chorale Ensemble” of approximately 30 singers, and the “Ad Hoc Singers,” about 15 in number. In September 1981, the name of the organization official changed to Columbia Chorale Ensembles, Inc. Ad Hoc Swingers, a local jazz ensemble, was added for one season.

The acting director, David Benz, consolidated the singers into one group, the Columbia Choral Ensemble, in January 1984. Dr. David Taylor was named director of the group later that year and served as director until August 1987 when Martin Hook became director.  In 1989, Glenna Betts Johnson joined the group as accompanist. In January 1991 Dr. R. Paul Drummond became director and was succeeded by Fred Kaiser in 2002. In 2003, Alex Innecco became the director. In 2013 Emily Edgington-Andrews became the current director.

References

   89.5 FM KOPN's Reel-to-Reel Reformatting Project:Spring Into the Arts June Concert Series 2007.  THE AD HOC SINGERS AT THE 1ST PRESBYTERIAN CHURCH, COLUMBIA, MO 1979 25:38.
 http://shs.umsystem.edu/manuscripts/invent/6201ca.pdf - State Historical Society of Missouri, Columbia Chorale, Columbia, Missouri, Records, (CA6201)
6 linear feet, 54 audio cassettes, 10 audio tapes, 10 CDs, 4 c.d.
Records of an independent, mixed ensemble dedicated to performing choral music. Founded as the Ad Hoc Singers in June 1978.
 December 2007 -   Sounds of a Missouri Christmas.  by Katherine Heine.  Rural Missouri.
 February 9, 2007 —   Symphony Titan to make its debut -  By Taryn B. Wood.  Columbia Missourian, Feb. 9, 2007.
 December 7, 2006 —   Solo auction over, roles set for Messiah - BY SYDNEY STONNER.  Columbia Missourian, Dec. 7, 2006.
 December 2, 2006 —   Lift Up Your Voice - By MARY T. NGUYEN.  Columbia Daily Tribune.  Saturday, December 2, 2006
 November 17, 2006 —  Singing Roles in Messiah for sale on eBay - By SYDNEY STONNER. Columbia Missourian. Nov. 17, 2006.
 March 16, 2006 —    Columbia Chorale brings Verdi opera to life - By Seth Ashley.  Columbia Daily Tribune.  March 16, 2006
 February 26, 2006 —   Triad of Talent. By Seth Ashley.  Columbia Daily Tribune.  February 26, 2006.
 December 8, 2005 —    The 'Messiah' is coming.  By Seth Ashley.  Columbia Daily Tribune.  December 8, 2005.
 September 10, 2010 -  First MOUMC series concert to benefit Mo. Theatre.  By Aarik Danielsen and Lynn Israel.  Columbia Daily Tribune Art Axis Blog.
 May 1, 2010 -  War and Peace in Concert.  Columbia Daily Tribune Calendar Section 2010.
 March 13, 2010 -    Opera Showdown. Columbia Daily Tribune Calendar Section 2010.
   Missouri Theater Center for the Arts Member Organizations Columbia Chorale.
  By Aarik Danielsen.  Classical Awakenings Alex Innecco imbues new MUMC concert season with sizzle, style and sublimity. Sunday, September 19, 2010. Columbia Daily Tribune.
   August 16, 2010: The future of classical music.  Intersection broadcast.  KBIA and RJI Institute.  Panelists: Alex Innecco, music director at Missouri United Methodist Church, director of the Columbia Chorale, and co-director of Carpe Diem. Robert Shay, director of the MU School of Music
   Thinking Out Loud:  Arts on Friday by KBIA Arts.  Podcast Arts on Friday: The Columbia Chorale's Alex Innecco. 4/30/10.
   The G. Ross Roy Collection of Robert Burns: an illustrated catalogue By Elizabeth A. Sudduth, George Ross Roy, Clayton Tarr, University of South Carolina Press; annotated edition.  2009.  Pg. 338 Columbia Chorale Ensemble 
(Columbia, Mo.).

See also
Missouri Symphony, a professional symphony orchestra

External links
Official site
Columbia Civic Orchestra
9th St. Philharmonic Orchestra
Missouri United Methodist church Concert Series 
University of Missouri-Columbia Concert Series
Missouri Theatre Center for the Arts
2012-2013 Season

American choirs
Musical groups established in 1978
Musical groups from Columbia, Missouri
1978 establishments in Missouri